House of X and Powers of X (abbreviated as HOX and POX) are two 2019 comic book miniseries published by Marvel Comics featuring the X-Men, by writer Jonathan Hickman and artists Pepe Larraz, R.B. Silva and Marte Gracia. Both books are part of a crossover storyline within the Marvel Universe that lead to the "Dawn of X" relaunch.

Publication history
After Jonathan Hickman completed his run on Avengers and New Avengers with the 2015 crossover "Secret Wars", he stepped away from Marvel Comics for a time to focus on creator-owned projects. His return was announced in March 2019. Some days later, it was revealed that he would write two interlocking miniseries entitled House of X and Powers of X, with penciling by Pepe Larraz and R.B. Silva respectively. Marvel Editor in Chief C. B. Cebulski said that "We are excited to have Jon back with the Marvel family, and we could not have asked for a better creative team to help usher the X-Men into a whole new era"

The comics marked a company-wide relaunch of the X-Men. To this end, all ongoing X-Men comics - Uncanny X-Men, Mr. and Mrs. X, X-Force, X-23, and the Age of X-Man miniseries - were cancelled.

Plot

Part 1: "The House that Xavier Built"
Several ambassadors arrive at the Jerusalem Habitat, responding to a telepathic message sent by Charles Xavier to recognize a new sovereign nation of Mutants, called Krakoa. The ambassadors are met by the newly appointed Krakoan ambassador Magneto.

Near the sun, spacecraft approach the station known as "The Forge," home base of a human group called Orchis. Orchis is the self-proclaimed "last hope" for humanity, made up of various members of human organizations such as A.I.M., S.H.I.E.L.D., Hydra, Alpha Flight, and others, allied to prevent the extinction of homo sapiens to mutants. 

Meanwhile, a team made up of Mystique, Sabretooth, and Toad infiltrate the base of Damage Control searching for information in the databases. While they get what they searched for, Sabertooth maims several guards in the chaos and is eventually captured by the Fantastic Four.

Part 2: "The Last Dream of Professor X"
In a dark future Earth, humans and mutants are locked in an apocalyptic, decades-long war, ultimately stemming from the creation of the mutant nation-state on Krakoa. A series of journal notes interspersed throughout the issue provide historical backstory.

Part 3: "The Uncanny Life of Moira X"
Details 10 different timelines in the life of Moira Kinross.

Part 4: "We Are Together Now, You and I"
Professor X and Moira McTaggert visit Magneto on his island base in Bermuda. Magneto agrees to Professor X and Moira's proposal, a long-term plan to guarantee the future of mutantkind.

Part 5: "This Is What You Do"
At the Temple of Concordance, the X-Men attack the Church of Ascendancy, an organization dedicated to the worship of the machines. Omega Sentinel confronts the X-Men and Rasputin IV kills all the remaining X-Men and the Sentinels.

Meanwhile, Apocalypse leads Wolverine's War form and Cypher's Famine form into an old machine databank to find an information crystal. War releases Mother Akkaba, also known as Moira, from her stasis. The Year One Hundred storyline is revealed to take place during Moira's ninth life.

Part 6: "Once More unto the Breach"
Cyclops informs X and Magneto that he has assembled a team in order to attack the Mother Mold facility orbiting the Sun. After meeting, they embark on the mission.

Part 7: "It Will Be Done"
On Krakoa, X and Magneto contact Marvel Girl to monitor the mission. Wolverine and Nightcrawler are successful in destroying the collars, but the ship is boarded by Orchis forces. The humans activate the Mother Mold, not knowing whether it will be sane or not. X tells them to do whatever it takes to stop it. Nightcrawler teleports Wolverine onto the collar before being instantly evaporated by the sun. Wolverine's healing factor allows him time to carve through it before he too is evaporated as the Mother Mold hurtles into the sun.

With the mission complete, Cyclops tries to locate Jean's pod, but Doctor Gregor executes him. The Sentinel drones arrive, intercept Jean's pod, and work to kill her. As his proteges have seemingly all died at the hands of humans once again, X cries and vows "no more."

Part 8: "Something Sinister"
X and Magneto head to the island of Bar Sinister to seek Mister Sinister's assistance to build a database of mutant DNA. He declines, but is promptly killed by another Mister Sinister clone with the mutant gene. That version readily agrees to help. Xavier then wipes the memory of their meeting from Mister Sinister's mind.

Part 9: "Society"
On Krakoa, X, Magneto, Storm, and Polaris assemble and are joined by five other mutants: Eva Bell, Proteus, Hope Summers, Elixir, and Egg. Magneto explains that the five mutants, collectively known as The Five, are able to revive deceased mutants. Storm brings The Five and the revived mutants out, proudly announcing that The Five has allowed the nation of Krakoa to defeat death. The revived mutants enter the crowd as Storm calls them the "Heroes of Krakoa".

Part 10: "For the Children"
X meets with Forge and asks him to modify Cerebro to allow it to store duplicate mutants' minds. In another timeline, X and Magneto meet with Emma Frost in the Louvre in order to recruit the Hellfire Corporation to aid in the establishment of Krakoa.

Part 11: "I Am Not Ashamed"
One month prior to the events of the series, Xavier uses Cerebro to offer Krakoa's miracle drugs to all of humanity.

Part 12: "House of X"
When Xavier sees all of Moira's lifetimes, Xavier is crushed by the experience and the revelation that mutant-kind will always lose. Moira explains that the one constant throughout all her lives is that Professor X is a good person and that she had to break that part of him to ensure mutant survival.

Characters involved

Main characters

Reception
House of X holds an average rating of 9.2 by 130 professional critics, while Powers of X holds a rating of 8.8 by 121 critics on review aggregation website Comic Book Roundup.

Prints

House of X issues

Powers of X issues

Collected editions

In other media 

 Marvel: Future Fight Features an alternate costume for Magneto, Wolverine, Professor X, Jean Grey and Storm based on his House of X incarnations.
 Marvel Contest of Champions Features an alternate costume for Magneto based on his House of X incarnation. Professor X, main costume based his House of X incarnation.
 X-Men '92 is based on House of X.

References

Note

Footnotes

2019 comics debuts
Comics by Jonathan Hickman
X-Men titles